"Talking in Your Sleep" is a song written by Roger Cook and Bobby Wood. The first recorded version of the song is by the band Marmalade, produced by Cook's longtime collaborator Roger Greenaway; Marmalade's version was also released as single in 1978 but failed to chart.

Crystal Gayle recording
"Talking in Your Sleep" was most successful when recorded by American country music artist Crystal Gayle.  It was released in January 1978 as the first single from the album When I Dream.  The song became a hit on both the country and pop charts in 1978. It peaked at number one on the US Country chart for two weeks, number eighteen on the US Pop chart and number three at the US Adult Contemporary chart.

In 1977, Gayle achieved international crossover Pop success for the first time with her No. 1 hit "Don't It Make My Brown Eyes Blue". Following the song's success, Gayle was recording more Pop and Adult Contemporary-styled Country tunes. This song is one of the first examples of this. "Talking in Your Sleep" was released in early 1978, and was a hit mid-year. The song proved an instant follow-up for Gayle on the Pop charts, being she hadn't had another Top 40 Pop hit since "Don't It Make My Brown Eyes Blue" the previous year.

"Talking in Your Sleep" was released on Gayle's major-selling album from that year called When I Dream. Following "Talking in Your Sleep"'s success as a crossover smash, Gayle only achieved one more Top 40 Pop hit as a solo artist, which came the next year with the song, "Half the Way". She also reached the Top Ten in 1982 with the hit single "You and I" a duet with Eddie Rabbitt.

Chart performance (Crystal Gayle version)

Other versions
"Talking in Your Sleep" was covered by Kikki Danielsson in 1979 on her debut album Rock'n Yodel  
Reba McEntire in 1995 on her album Starting Over.
Cilla Black released a version on her 1980 album Especially for You.
It was also covered by Martine McCutcheon on her album You Me & Us in 1999.

References

Songs about sleep
1978 singles
1978 songs
Crystal Gayle songs
Kikki Danielsson songs
Reba McEntire songs
Marmalade (band) songs
Martine McCutcheon songs
Songs written by Roger Cook (songwriter)
Song recordings produced by Allen Reynolds
United Artists Records singles
Songs written by Bobby Wood (songwriter)